Jan Šimák (born 13 October 1978) is a Czech former professional footballer who played as an attacking midfielder. He spent most of his career in Germany while making one appearance for the Czech Republic national team. As a player, he was well known for his powerful shot and goalscoring from midfield.

Career
Born in Tábor, Šimák began his professional career at Chmel Blšany.

In 2000, he left the Czech Republic joining 2. Bundesliga club Hannover 96. In his second season there, he contributed 18 goals to the club's promotion to the Bundesliga.

In the summer of 2002, Šimák joined Bayer 04 Leverkusen on a five-year contract. The transfer fee paid to Hannover was reported as €6 million. Signed as a replacement for Michael Ballack, he could not prevail at the Rhineland-side and returned the following year on loan to Hannover 96. After the sixth matchday he dropped out because of alcohol problems and a related depression fatigue syndrome. In July 2004, he dissolved his contract in Leverkusen.

A short time later, Šimák returned to his native Czech Republic to play for Sparta Prague. On 28 August 2004, he made his debut coming off the bench early in the second half for Rastislav Michalík in a 3–1 win against Chmel Blsany and scored the team's second goal for 2–1. In the following months, however, he was unable to repeat his performance of his first period at Hannover 96 and underwent therapy. He finished his first seasons with five appearances and as many appearances in the UEFA Champions League, where Prague was eliminated in the group stage.

On 19 November 2005, he celebrated his return, being substituted on for Martin Hasek in a 4–2 win on matchday 13 of the 2005–06 season. That season, he made nine starts in the league and two in the Champions League. In the 2006–07 season, his third and final one for Sparta Prague, he made 18 appearances scoring 1 goal, playing ten times in the league and five times in the UEFA Cup. His fight against his alcoholism and arguments with coaches in his three years in Prague cost him sympathies. Having publicly voiced his intentions to leave the club, he was not allowed to attend the training shortly before his departure. Overall, he was limited to a total of 51 matches and 3 goals.

In July 2007, Šimák changed again to Germany and signed a two-year contract with FC Carl Zeiss Jena who at the time were competing in the 2. Bundesliga.

In summer 2008 he moved to VfB Stuttgart.

On 19 January 2010, Šimák moved to 1. FSV Mainz 05. After one season with Mainz, he returned to FC Carl Zeiss Jena, but left in 2012 after the club were relegated from the 3. Liga

In summer 2012 he returned to Czech Republic for the second time signing a 6-month contract with newly formed FC MAS Táborsko hoping to move abroad again in January. In August 2014, he untied his contract with Táborsko because of health and personal issues.

Honours
 Czech First League: 2005, 2007

References

External links
 
 
 

1978 births
Living people
People from Tábor
Association football midfielders
Czech footballers
Czech Republic youth international footballers
Czech Republic under-21 international footballers
Czech Republic international footballers
Olympic footballers of the Czech Republic
FK Chmel Blšany players
Hannover 96 players
Bayer 04 Leverkusen players
AC Sparta Prague players
FC Carl Zeiss Jena players
VfB Stuttgart players
1. FSV Mainz 05 players
FC Silon Táborsko players
FK Bohemians Prague (Střížkov) players
SK Dynamo České Budějovice players
Bundesliga players
2. Bundesliga players
Czech First League players
3. Liga players
Czech expatriate footballers
Expatriate footballers in Germany
Footballers at the 2000 Summer Olympics
Sportspeople from the South Bohemian Region